Nine Martyrs of England and Wales, also known as Hugh Faringdon and Eight Companion Martyrs are a group of clergy and laypersons who were executed on charges of treason and related offences in the Kingdom of England. Eight of these occurred in 1539, during the reign of King Henry VIII, and one other in 1572. 
They are considered martyrs in the Roman Catholic Church and were beatified on 13 May 1895 by Pope Leo XIII.

List of individual names
They were chosen from a number of priests and laymen executed between 1539 and 1572, during the English Reformation. Their names were:
 John Beche
 John Eynon
 Hugh Faringdon (or Cook)
 Adrian Fortescue
 Roger James
 Thomas Percy, Earl of Northumberland 
 John Rugg (or Rugge)
 John Thorne
 Richard Whiting

Liturgical Feast Day
In England these martyrs, together with those beatified between 1886 and 1929, are commemorated by a feast day on 4 May. This day also honours the Forty Martyrs of England and Wales who hold the rank of saint; the Forty Martyrs were honoured separately on 25 October until the liturgical calendar for England was revised in the year 2000.

See also
List of Catholic martyrs of the English Reformation

References

Nine
English Reformation
History of Catholicism in England
Lists of Christian martyrs
Beatifications by Pope Leo XIII